Select Radio (formerly Select UK) is a London-based radio station, broadcasting on 94.4 FM to London and online, playing primarily house music. The station first broadcast as a pirate radio station in 2003, for many years on 99.3 FM before moving online. It applied for a legal license in May 2019 which it was awarded with a community radio license by Ofcom in May 2020, and commenced broadcasting in November 2021. Select Radio extended its broadcast area to include Norwich on DAB+ in April 2022 and Brighton on DAB+ in August 2022.

DJs include Above & Beyond, Oliver Heldens, Roger Sanchez,Paul van Dyk, and SillZee.

References

External links 
 Official website

Radio stations in London
Radio stations established in 2004
Dance radio stations